Alan Chermenovich Kokoyev (born 10 August 1967) is a Russian professional football coach and a former player.

Kokoyev played in the Russian Top League with FC Okean Nakhodka.

His son Batradz Kokoyev is now a professional footballer as well.

External links
 

Soviet footballers
Russian footballers
Russian Premier League players
FC Okean Nakhodka players
Russian expatriate footballers
Expatriate footballers in Georgia (country)
Russian football managers
1967 births
Living people
Association football goalkeepers
FC Smena Komsomolsk-na-Amure players